Robert Downs (born 24 July 1955) is a former English professional cyclist from Basildon, Essex.

Cycling career
He won the Sealink International in 1980 and competed at the 1980 Moscow Olympics in the Men's 100 kilometres Team Time Trial.

He represented England in the road race, at the 1978 Commonwealth Games in Edmonton, Alberta, Canada. Four years later he represented England and won a gold medal in the team time trial, at the 1982 Commonwealth Games in Brisbane, Queensland, Australia.

He rode for Manchester Wheelers' Club and was a professional between 1984 and 1989 ending his career with Percy Bilton.

Palmarès

1974
 1st Tour of Ireland
19876
  3rd in Premier Calendar
1977
  1st in  Gran Premio della Liberazione
  3rd in Stage 3 Milk Race, Sheffield (GBR)
1978
  3rd in General Classification Milk Race
  11th Commonwealth Games, Road race
1979
  1st in Premier Calendar
1980
   1st Overall, Sealink International
   9th Olympic Games, Team Time Trial (100 km)
1981
 4th Overall, Milk Race
 2nd in Stage 8 Milk Race, Scarborough
 2nd in Stage 11 Milk Race, Harrogate
   1st in Premier Calendar
1982
 6th Overall, Sealink International
  5th British National Road Race Championships (Amateur)
   4th Overall, Milk Race
  3rd in Stage 8 Milk Race, Skegness
 1982 Commonwealth Games
  Gold, Team Time Trial (with Malcolm Elliott, Joe Waugh and Steve Lawrence)
  10th Brisbane-Sydney
1984
  2nd in Milton Keynes
1986
  56th Nissan Classic

1987
  14th Kellogg's Tour of Britain
  3rd in Dublin
  1st in Porthcawl
1988
  2nd in Stage 3 Milk Race,  Plymouth
  3rd in South Shields
  2nd in Worksop

References

External links 
 
 
 
 
 
 

1954 births
Living people
English male cyclists
Olympic cyclists of Great Britain
Cyclists at the 1980 Summer Olympics
Commonwealth Games gold medallists for England
Cyclists at the 1978 Commonwealth Games
Cyclists at the 1982 Commonwealth Games
Sportspeople from Basildon
Commonwealth Games medallists in cycling
Medallists at the 1982 Commonwealth Games